Hữu Mai (7 May 1926 – 2007) was a Vietnamese writer. He was born in Thanh Hóa and wrote the memoirs of Võ Nguyên Giáp.

References

1926 births
2007 deaths
Vietnamese writers